Donald McMillan (1807 – July 15, 1876) was a Canadian businessman and political figure. He represented Vaudreuil in the 1st Canadian Parliament as a Conservative member.

He was born in Scotland in 1807, the son of Hugh McMillan, and came to Glengarry County in Upper Canada in 1823. He married Olympe Mongenais. McMillan later moved to Rigaud, where he sold flour and feed. He also served as lieutenant-colonel in the local militia. He died at Rigaud in 1876.

His son Hugh also later represented Vaudreuil in the House of Commons.

Electoral record

References 

1807 births
1876 deaths
Conservative Party of Canada (1867–1942) MPs
Members of the House of Commons of Canada from Quebec
Scottish emigrants to pre-Confederation Quebec
Anglophone Quebec people
Immigrants to Upper Canada
Scottish emigrants to pre-Confederation Ontario